The Clark Sisters: First Ladies of Gospel is a 2020 American biographical film about gospel group The Clark Sisters. Directed by Christine Swanson, and co-written by Sylvia L. Jones and Camille Tucker, the film stars Christina Bell, Kierra Sheard, Sheléa Frazier, Raven Goodwin, and Angela Birchett. It premiered on Lifetime on April 11, 2020.

Plot 
The film centers on the formation of gospel group The Clark Sisters, the daughters and pupils of gospel singer and devout Christian Mattie Moss Clark. The plot follows their journey from their hometown of Detroit to becoming the highest-selling gospel group in music history.

Cast

Production 

The movie was filmed between January and February 2019 in Toronto, Canada.

On March 27, 2019, it was announced that Queen Latifah's Flavor Unit Productions had greenlit the film to be released in 2020. Queen Latifah, Mary J. Blige, Missy Elliott, Loretha Jones and Holly Carter served as executive producers for the film.

The Clark Sisters: First Ladies of Gospel is the first authorized biopic about the group. The producers noted in an interview at the 2020 TCA press tour that estranged sister Denise Clark-Bradford was invited to be a part of the film but did not state the extent of her involvement.

The film was directed by Christine Swanson and written by Sylvia L. Jones and Camille Tucker, who wrote the story. Kierra Sheard portrayed her real-life mother, Karen Clark Sheard.

Soundtrack

Notes
 All songs produced by Donald Lawrence.
 Other songs performed in the film but not included on the soundtrack are "Hallelujah," "Is My Living in Vain," "Miracle" (a reworked version of The Clark Sisters' earlier "Expect Your Miracle" on their album of the same name), and the Karen Clark Sheard-penned "Blessed & Highly Favored."

Charts

The soundtrack album debuted at number eight on the Billboard Top Gospel Albums chart, where it remained in its second week. In its third week, the album slipped to number 23.

Release 
The film premiered on Lifetime on April 11, 2020.

Reception

Critical reception 
The Clark Sisters: First Ladies of Gospel premiere was the most-watched film on Lifetime in four years.

The film received mixed critical reception. In a review for rogerebert.com, Nell Minow rated the film 3.5/4 stars, calling Ellis's performance "mesmerizing" and the music "a gorgeous, spirit-lifting celestial chorus." Joelle Monique of The A.V. Club rated the film a C+ and wrote in the review, "...it feels like a chorus of Clark sisters, each with their interpretation of events, presented in a way that wouldn’t offend anyone person in the group." Writing for The Root, Panama Jackson stated in a more positive review: "It’s both heartwarming and endearing, while not skirting any of the issues that plagued their ultimately triumphant and still ongoing journey: domestic violence, gender inequality in the church, interpersonal issues, medical issues, mental health, life, etc."

Awards and nominations

References

External links 

The Clark Sisters: First Ladies of Gospel on Lifetime

Album chart usages for BillboardGospel
2020 biographical drama films
2020 television films
Lifetime (TV network) films
African-American biographical dramas
Films set in Detroit
2020 films
Biographical films about singers
2020s American films